Microlepidogaster perforatus is a species of armored catfish endemic to Brazil where it occurs in the Carandaí River.

Description
This species grows to a length of  SL.

References

Otothyrinae
Fish of South America
Endemic fauna of Brazil
Taxa named by Rosa Smith Eigenmann
Taxa named by Carl H. Eigenmann
Fish described in 1889